108–112 Quarry Street is a historic house located in Fall River, Massachusetts. The -story house was built in 1850.

Description and history 
At that time, it was considered to be a Greek Revival cottage in "pristine condition, representative of the best mid-19th century vernacular architecture in Fall River", with its original clapboard siding, windows, doors and detailing. However, since then, it has been significantly altered, with vinyl siding added and original doors, windows and detailing removed.

It was added to the National Register of Historic Places on February 16, 1983.

See also
National Register of Historic Places listings in Fall River, Massachusetts

References

Houses in Fall River, Massachusetts
National Register of Historic Places in Fall River, Massachusetts
Houses on the National Register of Historic Places in Bristol County, Massachusetts
Houses completed in 1850
Greek Revival houses in Massachusetts